The parc national d'Opémican is a provincial park of Quebec (Canada) located south of Abitibi-Témiscamingue, between Laniel and Témiscaming. It ensures the protection of the characteristic landscape of the Southern Laurentians.

Geography 
This park located in the natural region of the southern Laurentians is bordered on both sides by lakes Timiskaming and Kipawa. The Pointe-Opémican sector has a campground of around sixty sites under the tall pines, a small village of 11 ready-to-camp Étoile near Lake Timiskaming and its sandy shores, making it a great destination for nautical activities.

The park added a small hebertism course in the Rivière-Kipawa sector, near the Grande Chute. In addition, this sector has 4 ready-to-camp Étoile near the walls of Lake Timiskaming. White and red pines, symbol of the junction of the deciduous and boreal domains dominate in the park area.

Features

Flora 
About ten vascular plants are present.

Facilities and services 
A service center, located in the Pointe-Opémican sector, offers the park's main services, including a boutique and a convenience store, as well as information to visitors. There is also a reception post in Laniel.

Camping 
There is a rustic campground, that of Paroi-aux-Faucons, in the Kipawa River sector as well as a campground at Pointe-Opémican.

See also 
 Lake Timiskaming
 National Parks of Quebec

References

External links 
 
 Société des Établissements de Plein Air du Québec" - Sépaq.

National parks of Quebec
Protected areas of Abitibi-Témiscamingue
Témiscamingue Regional County Municipality